The  Ministry of Oil is the Iraqi government agency responsible for Iraqi petroleum. The Minister of Oil since May 2020 is Ihsan Abdul Jabbar Ismail.

Establishments
 North Oil Company (NOC)
 South Oil Company (SOC)
 Petroleum Research & Development Center (PRDC)
 Baiji Oil Training Institute (BAJOTI)
 Basrah Oil Training Institute (BASOTI)
 Kirkuk Oil Training Institute (KOTI)
 Baghdad Oil Training Institute (BOTI)
 Heavy Engineering Equipments Company (HEESCO)
 South Refineries Company (SRC)
 Midland Refineries Company (MRC)
 North Refineries Company (NRC)
 Gas Filling Company (GFC)
 Midland Oil Company (MDOC)
 South Gas Company (SGC)
 North Gas Company (NGC)
 Missan Oil Company (MOC)
 Iraqi Drilling Company (IDC)
 Oil Products Distribution Company (OPDC)
 State Organization for Marketing of Oil (SOMO)
 Oil Pipelines Company (OPC)
 Iraqi Oil Tankers Company (IOTC)
 Oil Exploration Company (OEC)
 State Company for Oil Projects (SCOP)

External links

Will Iraq Be a Global Gas Pump? The (Re)Making of a Petro-State Michael T. Klare, The Huffington Post, 14 July 2009

Oil
Economy of Iraq
Energy ministries
Oil reserves in Iraq